Robert Dowds (born 11 May 1953) is a former Irish Labour Party politician who served as a Teachta Dála (TD) for the Dublin Mid-West constituency from 2011 to 2016.

He was a member of South Dublin County Council for the Clondalkin electoral area from 1999 to 2011. He was re-elected at the 2004 local elections, serving as Mayor of South Dublin County Council from 2004 to 2005, and re-elected again at the 2009 local elections.

He did not contest the 2016 general election.

He attempted to get re-elected to South Dublin County Council in 2019, but was unsuccessful by a margin of 39 votes.

A member of the Church of Ireland, he went on scholarship to The King's Hospital private school in Dublin, and was also educated at Trinity College Dublin and St. Patrick's College, Drumcondra.

References

 

1953 births
Living people
Irish Anglicans
Labour Party (Ireland) TDs
Local councillors in South Dublin (county)
Members of the 31st Dáil
People educated at The King's Hospital
Alumni of Trinity College Dublin
Alumni of St Patrick's College, Dublin